This is a list of all tornadoes that were confirmed by local offices of the National Weather Service in the United States from March to April 2013.

United States yearly total

March

March 5 event

March 18 event

March 19 event

March 21 event

March 24 event

March 29 event

March 30 event

April

April 1 event

April 4 event

April 5 event

April 7 event

April 8 event

April 10 event

April 11 event

April 13 event

April 14 event

April 17 event

April 18 event

April 19 event

April 24 event

April 26 event

April 27 event

April 28 event

April 29 event

April 30 event

See also
Tornadoes of 2013

Notes

References

Tornadoes of 2013
2013 natural disasters in the United States
2013, 03
March 2013 events in the United States
April 2013 events in the United States